Tasmocrossea benthicola is a species of very small sea snail, a marine gastropod mollusk or micromollusk in the family Skeneidae.

This is the only species in the genus Tasmocrossea, a monotypic genus.

Description
The height of the shell attains 1.05 mm, its diameter 0.97 mm.

Distribution
This marine species is endemic to New Zealand and occurs off the Lord Howe Rise in the Tasman Sea at a depth of 536 m.

References

 Powell A. W. B., New Zealand Mollusca, William Collins Publishers Ltd, Auckland, New Zealand 1979 

Skeneidae
 
Gastropods of New Zealand
Gastropods described in 1952